Dickson High School is located in Dickson, Oklahoma. It houses grades 9–12. It is the home of the Comets. Its colors are blue, black, and white. It was awarded the Blue Ribbon for academic success.

Awards 
Its honors include 2008 state powerlifting champions in the large school class (classes 3A-6A), 2008 class 3A state powerlifting champions, and several skeet shoot state championships.

References

External links
 Dickson High School website

Public high schools in Oklahoma
Schools in Carter County, Oklahoma